Law & Order True Crime is an American true crime anthology series that premiered on September 26, 2017 on NBC. The series was ordered by NBC on July 15, 2016, and is part of the Law & Order franchise. Created by René Balcer, the eight-episode first season, titled Law & Order True Crime: The Menendez Murders, is a dramatization of the trial of Lyle and Erik Menendez, who were convicted in 1996 for the murder of their parents, José and Kitty Menendez. 
As of May 2018, the series is on hiatus.

Cast and characters

Main 
 Edie Falco as Leslie Abramson, the defense attorney who represented Lyle and Erik Menendez.
 Gus Halper as Erik, the younger brother 
 Miles Gaston Villanueva as Lyle, the older brother

Recurring 
Anthony Edwards as Judge Stanley Weisberg who oversaw Lyle and Erik's trial.
Julianne Nicholson as Jill Lansing, Abramson's partner on the defense team for the first trial.
Harry Hamlin as Barry Levin, Abramson's co-counsel on the second trial of Erik Menendez.
Constance Marie as Marta Cano, José's sister.
Carlos Gómez as José Menendez, Lyle and Erik's father.
Sam Jaeger as Detective Les Zoeller, the Beverly Hills Police Department detective who investigated the murders of José and Kitty Menendez.
Josh Charles as Dr. Jerome Oziel, Lyle and Erik's psychiatrist.
Sterling Beaumon as Glenn Stevens, Lyle's friend from Princeton University.
Ben Winchell as Donovan Goodreau.
Molly Hagan as Joan Vandermolen, Kitty's older sister.
Dominic Flores as Henry Llano, Lyle and Erik's cousin.
Lolita Davidovich as Kitty Menendez, Lyle and Erik's mother.
Chris Bauer as Tim Rutten, Leslie's husband and a Los Angeles Times journalist.
Heather Graham as Judalon Smyth, Oziel's emotionally fragile mistress.
Elizabeth Reaser as Deputy District Attorney Pam Bozanich, who was assigned to the murders of José and Kitty Menendez.
Larry Cedar as Milton Andersen, Kitty's older brother.
Ezra Buzzington as Deputy District Attorney Elliott Alhadeff, first prosecutor in case.
Raphael Sbarge as Jon Conte.
Taylor Kalupa as Anna Eriksson, Lyle’s fiancé & eventual wife.
Jenny Cooper as Megan Lang.
Irene DeBari as Maria Menendez, Lyle and Erik's grandmother.

Guest starring 

 Douglass Olsson as Robert Shapiro, Erik's lawyer (prior to Leslie Abramson) who arranged his surrender from Israel.

Cameo appearance 

 O. J. Simpson, actually portrayed by actor Dominic Daniel (and not himself), who is accused of murdering his ex-wife and her friend. He is shown to be jailed beside Erik, but only a voice is present during the conversations. He made an appearance in episode 8 when the news showed his actual verdict.

Episodes

Season 1: The Menendez Murders (2017)

Production
Filming for the series began on June 26, 2017 for an eight-episode first season. In April 2016, Dick Wolf and NBC announced they were working on the series, a first season being based on the Mendendez brothers murder case. A second season is yet to be confirmed, but Dick Wolf mentioned he has plenty of ideas for the show and a possible storyline if there is a second season. "This is unique for me, after 27 years of Law & Order," Wolf told TV critics at TCA in an interview. "This is taken from the headlines; we've made some great shows ripped from the headlines, but this is on a different level." An idea for a second season storyline includes the Oklahoma City bombing of 1995. "Just before the [Television Critics Association summer press tour], I had mentioned to him the Tim McVeigh case, and his eyes lit up," René Balcer says of Wolf's reaction. "Because Dick and I were together, we were in the same office when the bomb went off in Oklahoma."

Reception

Critical response
On Rotten Tomatoes, the season has an approval rating of 64% based on 34 reviews, with an average rating of 6.6/10. The site's critical consensus reads, "Law & Order: True Crime: The Menendez Murders benefits from a standout performance from Edie Falco that proves captivating enough to compensate for a staid approach to potentially drama-rich material." On Metacritic, the season has a weighted average score of 57 out of 100, based on 29 critics, indicating "mixed or average reviews". In his series of reviews of each episode, Austin Considine of the New York Times wrote that this mini-series succeeded in bringing something new and compelling to the well-known Menendez case.

Ratings

Awards and nominations

See also
American Crime Story, a similar true crime anthology series that depicts high-profile cases
Manhunt: Unabomber, the first season of Discovery Channel's true crime anthology series

References

2017 American television series debuts
2017 American television series endings
2010s American crime drama television series
2010s American documentary television series
American television spin-offs
English-language television shows
Law & Order (franchise)
NBC original programming
Television series based on actual events
Television series by Universal Television
Television series by Wolf Films
True crime television series
Television series about prosecutors